André Vanderdonckt was a French cyclist, born 29 February 1908 in Flers-lez-Lille, died 5 August 1982 in Wattrelos. He was professional 1927-1935.

Honours 
Grand Prix de Fourmies (1931)
French cyclo-cross champion (1933)
Paris-Angers (1934)
Paris-Dunkerque (1935)

1908 births
1982 deaths
People from Villeneuve-d'Ascq
French male cyclists
Sportspeople from Nord (French department)
Cyclists from Hauts-de-France